100 días para enamorarnos (English: 100 Days To Fall In Love) is an American comedy drama television series that premiered on Telemundo on 28 April 2020, with the 30 minutes of the first episode given a special pre-release online on 21 April 2020. The series is an adaptation of the Argentine telenovela created by Sebastián Ortega titled 100 días para enamorarse, which had a recent Chilean version released in 2019 on Mega with the same name. The series received media attention for LGBTQ characters like Alejandra Rivera who explores romantic feelings for a woman and then embraces his "gender identity." The second season was made available for streaming outside the United States on Netflix and Blim TV on 10 February 2021.

The series is starring an ensemble cast headed by Ilse Salas, Mariana Treviño, Erick Elías, and David Chocarro.

Plot 
The story revolves around two good friends, Constanza Franco (Ilse Salas), a very sophisticated and successful lawyer, in addition to mother and wife; and to Remedios Rivera (Mariana Treviño), in the shoes of Mariana Treviño, also a loving mother and wife, but who, unlike her friend, is a free spirit who cannot keep her life in order. Both women decide to end 20 years of marriage with their respective husbands. Remedios's life is complicated when she decides to separate from her current husband and her first love reappears. Meanwhile, Constanza agrees with her husband to take a 100-day break. Once the 100 days are up, they will have to decide whether to keep the marriage or not.

Cast

Main 

 Ilse Salas as Constanza Franco
 Mariana Treviño as Remedios Rivera
 Erick Elías as Plutarco Cuesta
 David Chocarro as Emiliano León
 Sylvia Sáenz as Jimena Sosa
 Sofía Lama as Aurora Villareal
 Héctor Suárez Gomís as Luis Casas
 Andrés Almeida as Max Barrios
 Manuel Balbi as Fernando Barroso
 Lucas Velázquez as Pablo Franco
 Daniela Bascopé as Isabel Morales
 Macarena García as Alejandra Rivera
 Xabiani Ponce de León as Daniel Cuesta
 Gabriel Tarantini as Benjamín Flores
 Fernanda Urdapilleta as Lucía Sandoval Blanco
 Sheryl Rubio as Mariana Velarde
 Macaria as Mónica Franco
 Eduardo Ibarrola as Pedro Franco
 Shaula Vega as Marlene Blanco
 Beatriz Monroy as Vicky Medina
 Thamara Aguilar as Teresa "Tere"  Medina
 Isabella Sierra as Susana Casas Sosa
 Gael Sánchez as Marín Cuesta
 Andrés Pirela as Nicolás "Nico" Casas Villareal
 Humberto Zurita as Ramiro Rivera

Guest stars 
 Scarlet Ortiz as Gloria
 Carlos Torres as Fabián "Lobo" Ramírez
 Fabián Ríos as Iván Acosta

Production 
The show is produced by Telemundo Global Studios and filming in Miami, United States. The production of the series was officially confirmed on 23 October 2019. On 18 March 2020, Telemundo suspended production of the telenovela temporarily due to the COVID-19 pandemic in the United States. Filming resumed on 6 July 2020, and concluded on 31 July 2020.

Ratings 
 
}}

Episodes

Series overview

Season 1 (2020)

Season 2 (2021)

References

External links 
 

Telemundo original programming
Telemundo telenovelas
2020 telenovelas
Spanish-language television shows
Spanish-language telenovelas
Television series about dysfunctional families
2020 American television series debuts
Spanish-language television programming in the United States
Television productions suspended due to the COVID-19 pandemic
2020s American LGBT-related comedy television series
American television series based on Argentine television series